Stronghold is a series of real-time strategy video games developed by Firefly Studios and set in medieval times.

Games

Stronghold 

This is the first version

Stronghold: Crusader 

The second installment, Stronghold: Crusader, was released in September 2002. The gameplay is similar to the first game, but with enhanced RTS elements and with all maps and missions set entirely in the Middle East during the Middle Ages. The focus was radically influenced by fortification and siege technologies developed during the Crusades. The entire campaign, as well as the "Conquest Trail" game mode, takes place during the Third Crusade.

Unlike the original Stronghold, however, there are four separate, linear campaigns. The game does take history into effect: Saladin and Richard I of England are present as the game's AI characters for the player to side with or against. In addition, the player is allowed to play either as an Arabic lord or as a European king with little difference between the two options except which units the player begins with.

A combination pack of Stronghold and Stronghold: Crusader, called Stronghold Warchest, was later released with all patches applied, new maps, and a new campaign trail and AI characters in Crusader.

Stronghold 2 

The direct sequel to the first game and the third overall game in the series, Stronghold 2, was released in April 2005. The game engine was enhanced to provide fully 3D graphics. Other changes include new military and peace campaigns and the addition of crime and punishment. It also included many new characters and changed the types of walls and towers that can be added to a castle. However, the series' unique real-time map editor was replaced with a still-life one.

Upon its release, many players were outraged by the game's frequent crashes, lag (even while playing offline on a computer with exceptional hardware), and overall buggy nature. Firefly Studios paid much attention to the gaming community's complaints, and promised fixes in later patches. The majority of complaints stopped with patch 1.2. Patch 1.3.1, released on October 28, 2005, brought a "Conquest Trail" to the game, similar to that of Stronghold: Crusader. Stronghold 2 Deluxe was later released, containing all of the patches and new content.

Critically, Stronghold 2 received generally mixed reviews, with criticism directed at the bugs present in the initial release and the gameplay. To promote Stronghold 2, a ten-level Flash game was created, called Castle Attack 2. The aim of the game was to balance building a castle and defending it.

Stronghold Legends 

The fourth game in the series, Stronghold Legends, contains 24 missions spanning three different campaigns: King Arthur and his Knights of the Round Table, Count Vlad Dracul, and Siegfried of Germany.
This sequel contains a new feature that allows the player to control human and mythical armies. Creatures like dragons and witches can be created in Stronghold Legends.

Stronghold Crusader Extreme 

The fifth game, Stronghold Crusader Extreme, is largely the same as Stronghold: Crusader, but with an expanded unit cap, allowing thousands of units to be on screen at once (instead of the hundreds in Stronghold: Crusader). It also includes an updated version of the original Stronghold: Crusader game with new AI and maps.

Stronghold Kingdoms 

Stronghold Kingdoms is the first MMO-style game in the Stronghold series. In this free-to-play game, players can anticipate a world filled with elements from the first game of the series.

Stronghold 3 

Stronghold 3 is a 2011 real-time strategy game and the seventh in the series after several spin-offs, a remake, and an MMORTS. It is a direct sequel to Stronghold and Stronghold 2. Unlike previous games in the series, which were published by Take-Two Interactive, the game was published by SouthPeak Games, the new parent company of Gamecock Media Group, publisher of Stronghold Crusader Extreme.

Stronghold Crusader II 

Stronghold Crusader II is the next title in Firefly Studios' Stronghold franchise, released on September 23, 2014.

Stronghold: Warlords 

Stronghold: Warlords is a real-time strategy game by Firefly Studios. It was revealed during E3 2019 and was originally planned to be released on September 29, 2020, but was delayed to January 26, 2021, due to the COVID-19 pandemic. Due to further issues regarding multiplayer, the release date was moved back another six weeks, and was finally released on March 9, 2021.

References 

 
Video game franchises introduced in 2001
Video games set in castles